New Fork is a ghost town in Sublette County, Wyoming, United States, near Boulder. It was one of the earliest settlements in the upper Green River valley. New Fork was established in 1888 by John Vible and Louis Broderson, Danish immigrants who had arrived in the United States in 1884. They established a store along the Lander cut-off of the Oregon Trail. By 1908 a small town had grown around the store, and in 1910 Vible built a dance hall, called The Valhalla.

In the early years of the settlement, the local Bannock and Shoshoni Indians from the Wind River Indian Reservation accounted for much of the town's trade. Vible and Broderson's original store was a log cabin, selling supplies obtained in  Evanston.

The death of Vible and members of his family from diphtheria and scarlet fever in 1915 started a decline, exacerbated by the abandonment of the Lander cut-off. Mail service stopped in 1918.

Several log and frame buildings remain in the townsite.

References

External links
New Fork at the Wyoming State Historic Preservation Office

Geography of Sublette County, Wyoming
Ghost towns in Wyoming
Historic districts on the National Register of Historic Places in Wyoming
National Register of Historic Places in Sublette County, Wyoming
Populated places on the National Register of Historic Places in Wyoming